Al-Bayyina or The Evidence  (al-bayyinah, aka "The Clear Proof") is the 98th Chapter (surah) of the Qur'an, with 8 ayat or verses. The Surah is so designated after the word al-bayyinah occurring at the end of the first verse.

Summary 
1-2 The idolaters stagger at the revelations of the Quran
3-4 Jews and Christians dispute among themselves since the advent of Muhammad and his new religion
5 Unbelievers of all classes threatened with divine judgments
6 Those who disbelieve, from the People of the Book, and polytheists are the worst of all creatures, destined for hell
7-8 'Those who believed and done righteous deeds' are “the best of creatures”; their reward

See also
 People of the Book

References

External links 
Quran 98 Clear Quran translation

 Haddad, Journal of the American Oriental Society, vol. 97, mo. 4. (Oct. – Dec. 1977), pp. 519–530.

Bayyina